Fularji is a district of the province of Heilongjiang, People's Republic of China. It is under the jurisdiction of the prefecture-level city of Qiqihar.

Administrative divisions 
Fularji District is divided into 8 subdistricts, 1 township and 1 ethnic township. 
8 subdistricts
 Hong'an, Yanjiang, Dianli, Xingfu, Hongbaoshi, Beixing, Tiebei, Heping
1 township
 Changqing
1 ethnic township
 Duermenqin Daur

References

Districts of Qiqihar